Brendon McNichol (born November 1969),  is a lap-steel/guitar player, who has played with bands including Queens of the Stone Age, Masters of Reality.

Biography
In 1990 Brendon lived in Hollywood, California.

The Drills released a 5-song EP in 1991 produced by Dave Jerden.
In 1996 Brendon joined Masters of Reality led by Chris Goss, and appeared on tour with the band, and on the live album "How High The Moon: Live At The Viper Room".
In 2000 he joined Queens of the Stone Age, teaming up with his longtime friend Josh Homme, playing not only guitar, but also lap-steel and piano. Besides touring he also recorded various studio songs. 
Brendon has also played with bands including K.C. and the Sunshine Band, The Drills, Stacy Q., Pablo Moses , Michigan and Smiley, Charlie Chaplan, Drone w/ Ted Parsons, Desert Sessions, Levi Chen, Photek, Discordia, The Dwarves, Palmerville as well as countless soundtracks, commercials and albums as a session player.

Bands
 the Drills (band) (1990–1995)
 Masters of Reality (1996–present)
 Queens of the Stone Age (1999–2001)

Living people
American punk rock guitarists
Queens of the Stone Age members
1969 births
American male guitarists
20th-century American guitarists